The 2006–07 season was Ross County's seventh consecutive season in the Scottish First Division, having been promoted as champions of the Scottish Second Division at the end of the 1999–2000 season. They also competed in the Challenge Cup, League Cup and the Scottish Cup.

Summary
Ross County finished tenth in the First Division and were relegated to the Second Division. They reached the second round of the League Cup, the third round of the Scottish Cup, and the final of the Challenge Cup, beating Clyde 5–4 on penalties.

Management
The club started season 2006–07 under the management of Scott Leitch, who had been appointed towards the end of the previous season. On 30 April 2007, following the club's confirmed relegation Leitch resigned as manager.

Results and fixtures

Scottish First Division

Scottish Challenge Cup

Scottish League Cup

Scottish Cup

League table

Player statistics

Squad 
 

|}

See also
 List of Ross County F.C. seasons

References

Ross County
Ross County F.C. seasons